A Momentary Lapse of Reason Tour was two consecutive concert tours by the British rock band Pink Floyd. The A Momentary Lapse of Reason tour ran from September 1987 to August 1988; the Another Lapse tour ran from May–July 1989. Both tours were in support of their album A Momentary Lapse of Reason (1987). The tour was the band's first since The Wall tour in 1981, and also the first without the band's original bassist Roger Waters. The band later reprised the setlist and stage show of this tour for their performance at Knebworth Park in 1990.

History
Initially, there was a great deal of uncertainty around the tour. Pink Floyd had not played live since 1981, and had not embarked on a full-fledged tour since 1977. Roger Waters left the band in 1985, believing the band would not continue. However, Gilmour and Mason decided to continue as Pink Floyd. Waters threatened legal action against Gilmour and Mason, as well as any promoters who promoted shows as "Pink Floyd". However, by the end of 1987, with the success of the album and first stages of the tour, the new lineup had established itself commercially, and the band reached a settlement with Waters in December.

Having the success of The Wall shows to live up to, the concerts' special effects were more impressive than ever. The initial "promotional tour" was extended, and finally lasted almost two years, ending in 1989 after playing around 197 concerts to about 5.5 million people in total,  including 3 dates at Madison Square Garden (5–7 October 1987) and 2 nights at Wembley Stadium (5–6 August 1988). The tour took Pink Floyd to various exotic locations they had never played before such as shows in the forecourt of the Palace of Versailles, Moscow's Olympic Stadium, and Venice, despite fears and protests that the sound would damage the latter city's foundations. The tour marked the first time that the band played in Soviet Union, Norway, Spain and New Zealand, and was the first time they had played in Australia since 1971 and Japan since 1972.

Worldwide, the band grossed around US$135 million, making A Momentary Lapse of Reason the highest-grossing tour of the 1980s.

A further concert was held at the Knebworth Festival in 1990, a charity event that also featured other Silver Clef Award winners. Pink Floyd was the last act to play, to an audience of 120,000. During this gig Clare Torry joined Vicki and Sam Brown in providing backing vocals, Candy Dulfer contributing saxophone solos. The £60,000 firework display that ended the concert was entirely financed by the band. These shows are documented by the Delicate Sound of Thunder album, video and Live at Knebworth '90 video. Video of both the Venice and Knebworth concerts were released on Blu-Ray and DVD in The Later Years boxset.

Personnel
David Gilmour – lead vocals, lead guitars and console steel guitar (on "One of These Days" and "The Great Gig In The Sky")
Nick Mason – drums, percussion
Richard Wright – keyboards, backing vocals and harmony vocals
Additional musicians:
Jon Carin – keyboards, sound effects, vocals, additional percussion
Scott Page – saxophones, oboe, additional guitars
Guy Pratt – bass guitar, vocals
Tim Renwick – guitars, backing vocals
Gary Wallis – percussion, additional keyboards
Rachel Fury – backing vocals
Durga McBroom – backing vocals (from Omni shows in 1987 forward)
Margaret Taylor – backing vocals (during the 1987-88 dates)
Lorelei McBroom – backing vocals (at The Omni shows 1987 and the 1989 dates)
Roberta Freeman – backing vocals (at The Omni shows 1987)

Knebworth Park additional musicians:
 Guy Pratt – bass guitar, vocals
 Jon Carin – keyboards, vocals
 Tim Renwick – rhythm and occasional lead guitars, backing vocals
 Gary Wallis – percussion
 Durga McBroom, Sam Brown, Vicki Brown, Clare Torry – backing vocals
 Candy Dulfer – saxophone

Set list

Tour
The first set mainly consisted of songs from A Momentary Lapse of Reason and the second of hits and older songs. See notes on individual tour dates to see changes made to the usual set list.

First Set:
 "Shine On You Crazy Diamond, Parts I-V" (replaced "Echoes" after 25 September 1987, omitted on 30 April 1988)
 "Signs of Life"
 "Learning to Fly"
 "Yet Another Movie"
"Round and Around" ("Yet Another Movie" & "Round and Around" were moved to this position from 19 September 1987 onward. They were originally performed after "The Dogs of War".)
 "A New Machine, Part 1"
 "Terminal Frost"
 "A New Machine, Part 2" ("A New Machine" [both parts] & "Terminal Frost" were omitted on 13–14 June 1988, 1 July 1988, 3 July 1988, 2 August 1988, 5–6 August 1988, 8 August 1988.)
 "Sorrow"
 "The Dogs of War"
 "On the Turning Away"

Second set:
 "One of These Days"
 "Time" (omitting "Breathe (Reprise)")
 "On the Run" (omitted from 2–11 March 1988)
 "The Great Gig in the Sky" (added to the set on 2 March 1988)
 "Wish You Were Here"
 "Welcome to the Machine" (performed on all dates except on 30 April 1988)
 "Us and Them"
 "Money"
 "Another Brick in the Wall, Part 2"
 "Comfortably Numb"

Encore:
 "One Slip" (performed on all dates except on 19 September 1987)
 "Run Like Hell"

Second Encore:
 "Shine On You Crazy Diamond, Parts I-V" (Only performed from 12–16 September 1987 and was under-rehearsed. It was also performed in a second, unplanned, encore on 19 September 1987.)

Grand Canal, Venice, 15 July 1989  – Live TV concert

This was a special performance on a floating platform, for live Italian TV and was also broadcast worldwide. Due to time restrictions of live TV some songs were left out and others shortened in places. Before the concert, city authorities were so worried about the effects of loud amplified music on the ancient structures of the city that Pink Floyd agreed to play more quietly than usual. The influx of 200,000 fans into the city, and the outcry arising from the mountains of litter left behind and the inevitable consequences of the lack of toilet facilities, led to the entire city council resigning after the concert.

 "Shine On You Crazy Diamond, Part I" (intro only)
 "Learning to Fly"
 "Yet Another Movie"
 "Round and Around"
 "Sorrow" (shortened outro)
 "The Dogs of War"
 "On the Turning Away"
 "Time"
 "The Great Gig in the Sky"
 "Wish You Were Here"
 "Money" (shorter than had previously been performed on the tour)
 "Another Brick in the Wall, Part 2"
 "Comfortably Numb"
 "Run Like Hell"

Knebworth House, Knebworth, 30 June 1990 – Silver Clef Award Winners Concert 
 "Shine On You Crazy Diamond, Parts I-V" (featuring Candy Dulfer)
 "The Great Gig in the Sky"
 "Wish You Were Here"
 "Sorrow"
 "Money"
 "Comfortably Numb"
 "Run Like Hell"

Tour dates

See also 
 List of highest-grossing concert tours

References

External links 
Brain Damage.co.uk
Pink Floyd Archives

Pink Floyd concert tours
1987 concert tours
1988 concert tours
1989 concert tours
Reunion concert tours